High Heat is a young adult novel by Carl Deuker published in 2003. Deuker uses baseball to track his main character's character arc.  In a baseball game, the score changes several times, and the author explores the role of sports in helping people feel a sense of control over their lives.

Summary

The story opens with the first baseball game of the season for Shane Hunter's high school team. Shane is the team's “closer,” the pitcher brought in at the end of the game to hold a lead and typically a power pitcher who can dominate batters. He's hanging out with his friends Greg and Cody and the team is winning. Shane's parents are in the bleachers. Shane's father runs a car dealership and they are very well off, which is why Shane attends a private school in Seattle. As Shane and his friends watch, police come and arrest Shane's father in front of everyone. The game ends and Shane's coach, Mr. Levine, gives Shane a ride home to the exclusive gated community where his family lives. They arrive to find police there with his mother, going through files and taking evidence away. Shane talks with his younger sister Marian, who is very upset. When the police leave their mother takes them out to dinner and then has a long conversation with their lawyer. She explains that Shane's Dad has been arrested for money laundering and may have been involved with drug dealers who needed to launder their money through a local business. Shane's father is released on bail. When Shane returns to school, everyone is talking about him, and he gets into a fight with some teammates at baseball practice. Coach Levine breaks it up and doesn't punish Shane. Shane vows to not let his emotions show any more. Shane's father begins drinking heavily. Shane blows his next two saves, distracted by his father's presence and the whole situation. When Shane's father has to skip a game to meet with the police, Shane pitches a great game and gets the save. He realizes it was because his parents weren't there, which depresses him. When Coach Levine drives Shane home after the game, they discover that Shane's father has committed suicide by shooting himself. Shane learns that the family doesn't have as much money as he thought, and his mother is forced to sell their large house and pull Marian and Shane out of private school. They move into a small, run-down apartment in a bad area of town and enroll in public school. Shane falls in with a gang of tough kids and is angry and unhappy. He begins drinking and smoking, is caught stealing, and is subsequently sentenced to community service. He performs his community service by helping to fix up a public baseball field. The manager of one of the teams sees that Shane has a true love for the game and convinces him to start playing again for his team as the closer. Shane's probation officer had suggested therapy, but Shane convinces him and his mother that it's not necessary because he's going to play baseball again. Shane finds solace in pitching and does well for his new team, but still has anger issues and finds relief only when he is pitching. This changes when Shane sees a new family move into his old house; their son, Reese, begins hanging out with Shane's old friends and gets his spot on the school's baseball team. At a game he finds himself pitching against Reese and gets very angry, so he throws as hard as he can at Reese's head. Reese's helmet is broken and Reese is badly injured. Shane is wracked with guilt. Reese slowly recovers, but he's not the same hitter he was. Shane drops off the team and stops pitching altogether. He visits Reese and begins to spend time with him, getting to know him and working through his guilt. He discovers that like him Reese's life wasn't perfect. They are at first angry with each other but they begin to practice together. Through baseball, they bond and begin to become friends. By working with Reese, Shane is able to release his guilt and anger and rediscovers his love for the game of baseball. He realizes that his anger and his acting out regarding the events of his Dad's arrest and suicide haven't helped and have only made things worse, and he remembers how good and in-control he felt when pitching. Encouraged by Reese, he begins pitching again, putting all of the energy he was funneling through anger and self-pity into the sport. He begins to pitch very well again, becoming the closer he was at the beginning of the story. He is scouted by the University of Portland for a possible scholarship.

References

2003 novels
Literature articles needing expert attention